Beta-1,3-N-acetylglucosaminyltransferase radical fringe, also known as radical fringe is a protein that in humans is encoded by the RFNG gene. Radical fringe is a signaling enzyme involved in the arrangement of the embryonic limb buds. It is a member of the fringe gene family, which also includes manic fringe and lunatic fringe. It is important for the dorsoventrally patterning of the limb and has been implicated in the formation of the apical ectodermal ridge (AER). The AER is essential for the distal patterning of the limb. Experiments executed in chicken models show Radical fringe is expressed in both the dorsal ectoderm and the AER. This provides evidence that the AER forms from cells already expressing radical fringe, though further evidence is needed to confirm. Grafting experiments have shown that formation of the AER comes from signals in the limb bud mesoderm. However, radical fringe acts as a permissive signal to create a boundary for the AER to form. The knockout experiments done in chicken models suggest Radical fringe plays an integral role in wing development. 

Conversely, knockout experiments in mice have shown that if Radical fringe is absent no phenotypic differences occur. Further study revealed the absence of mutation is most likely due to redundancy of Manic and Lunatic fringe, which likely take over in the absence of Radical fringe. Radical, Manic, and lunatic fringe genes make up a group of enzymes known as 3-beta-N-acetylglucosaminyltransferases. They elongate O-linked fucose residues on notch receptors, which effects neurogenesis through the notch signaling pathway. While Radical fringe may not be vital for limb formation in all species, current research suggests it plays an integral role in establishing the pattern of the developing limb when expressed.

References

Further reading 

 
 
 

Genes